Angk Snuol is a district (srok) of Kandal Province, Cambodia. The district is subdivided into 16 communes (khum) such as Baek Chan, Boeng Thum, Chhak Chheu Neang, Damnak Ampil, Kamboul, Kantaok, Krang Mkak, Lumhach, Mkak, Ovlaok, Peuk, Ponsang, Prey Puok, Samraong Leu, Snao, Tuol Prech and 307 villages (phum).

References

External links
Kandal at Royal Government of Cambodia website
Kandal at Ministry of Commerce website

Districts of Kandal province